The Venerable John Holt, DCL was an Anglican priest in England]. 

Hodges was born in Aston and educated at Christ Church, Oxford. He held the living at Ripple, Worcestershire and was Archdeacon of Salop from 1732 until his death in 1734.

Notes 

1734 deaths
Alumni of Christ Church, Oxford
Archdeacons of Salop
People from Warwickshire
18th-century English Anglican priests